The Future Champions Tournament is an international youth association football tournament which was first contested in 2009 in the Gauteng region of South Africa. The 3rd and the 5th edition took place in Belo Horizonte, Brazil.

List of champions
Below is the list of champions:

References

Youth football competitions